Lachyan is a village located in Indi taluk, Bijapur district, Karnataka, India. The total area of Lachyan is 2517 hectares.

Shri Siddhaling Maharaj Math is a famous temple in Bijapur District.

References 

Villages in Bijapur district, Karnataka